is a voice actress signed to 81 Produce.

Voice roles

Anime
2006
Zenmai Zamurai as Townsperson

2007
Sore Ike! Anpanman as Knot-chan
Bamboo Blade as Iguchi, Schoolgirl
Mega Man Star Force as MC

2008
Aria as underclassman B
Gintama as Maguko
Golgo 13 as Mario's daughter, secretary
Scarecrowman: The Animation as Boy
Antique Bakery as customer C
Senryoku Usagi
Soul Eater as Mizune, Risa, Gaya, student A, woman A
XxxHolic: Kei as Schoolgirl A, Schoolgirl B
Miracle! Mikika as Akari Oshiushi
Major as Hisaya's fan
Rosario + Vampire as Schoolgirl

2009
Kimi ni Todoke as Eriko Hirano
Genji Monogatari Sennenki as wife C, woman CWhispered Words as Azusa AoiShin Mazinger Shougeki! Z Hen as RollZettai Karen Children as StudentSore Ike! Anpanman as Kuma Dai, Croissant PrincessDuel Masters as Sky, child B, girl C, AnnouncementPandora Hearts as SchoolgirlBeyblade: Metal Fusion as Lina Mekoyama, Boy 2, Audience A

2010Maid Sama! as Boy AThe World God Only Knows as Izumi IshikiriK-On! as Student council treasurerKeshikasu-kun as MinakoRomance of the Three Kingdoms (2009 animation)Tatakau Shisho as RatiTegami Bachi Reverse as Hospitalized girlDuel Masters as child B, Girl, ChaiNaruto Shippuden as TanishiBakuman as Female AnnouncerFortune Arterial as Girl

2011A Channel as Child
Metal Fight Beyblade 4D as Yuki MizusawaCardfight Vanguard as Maron, Yuri Usui, World TreeThe World God Only Knows II as Schoolgirl, Kikki, Alumni, Announcer, Weather forecaster, MerukoKimi ni Todoke (2nd season) as Eriko HiranoSket Dance as YukinoThe Mystic Archives of Dantalian as Boy DBakumanHyouge Mono as Concubine, WifePocket Monsters Diamond & Pearl the Movie - Giratina and the Sky's Bouquet: Shaymin as TakaSasameki Koto as Azusa Aoi

2012Cardfight Vanguard: Asia Circuit as Yuri UsuiZoobles! as Harry, Earl Hiiro no Kakera2013Cardfight Vanguard: Asia Circuit as Yuri Usui, Queen YRobocar Poli as Helly Pocket Monsters XY as Serena

2014Pokémon the Movie XY: The Cocoon of Destruction and Diancie as Serena

2015Pocket Monsters: XY&Z as SerenaPokémon the Movie XY - The Archdjinni of the Rings: Hoopa as SerenaGo! Princess PreCure as Karin Akeboshi

2016Age 12: A Little Heart-Pounding as Marin OguraPokémon the Movie XY&Z: Volcanion and the Exquisite Magearna as Serena

2018Puzzle & Dragons as Mizuki Okumura

2022Drifting Dragons as Waitress

2022Master Journeys as Serena

DubbingAdventure Time as additional voicesKung Fu Panda: Legends of Awesomeness'' as Mei Li and Lian

References

External links
Official blog
81 Produce Profile

1984 births
81 Produce voice actors
Living people
Voice actresses from Aichi Prefecture
Japanese voice actresses